Berwick High School may refer to:

 Berwick High School (Louisiana), a public high school in Berwick, Louisiana, USA
 Berwick High School (Berwick, Maine), listed on the National Register of Historic Places in York County
 Berwick Area Senior High School, (also called Berwick High School), a public high school in Berwick, Pennsylvania, USA

See also
 North Berwick High School, a public high school in North Berwick, East Lothian, Scotland, UK 
 Noble High School (Maine) a public high school in North Berwick, Maine, USA  
 Berwick Secondary College, a public high school in Victoria, Australia
 Berwick Academy (disambiguation)
 Berwick (disambiguation)